The Sweetest Hangover is the third album by German musician Miss Platnum. It was released on 4 September 2009 under the label Four Music. The song "Why Did You Do It?" was already released in 2008, as a promotional single. The first single, "She Moved In!" was released on 14 August 2009 and reached #51 of the German Singles Chart.

Track listing

Charts

References

Miss Platnum albums
2009 albums